Laukaha Bazar railway station serves Laukaha town in Madhubani district in the Indian state of Bihar. It located near the India–Nepal border.

Geography
The area is slightly highland as against low lands all around. Numerous rivers flow in from Nepal and some of them cross the area. Laukaha is near the India–Nepal boundary and an extension of State Highway 51 (Khutuana–Laukaha Road)  connects it to many towns in Nepal.

History
The area was developed with metre-gauge tracks. The Sakri–Jainagar branch was opened in 1905. The Jhanjharpur–Laukaha Bazar line was opened in 1976.

Gauge conversion
The -long Jainagar–Darbhanga–Narkatiaganj line and Sakri–Laukaha Bazar–Nirmali line were being converted from metre to broad gauge in 2011–2012.

References

External links
 Departures from Laukaha Bazar

Railway stations in Madhubani district
Railway stations opened in 1976
Samastipur railway division